The 2021 North Carolina Central Eagles football team represented North Carolina Central University as a member of the Mid-Eastern Athletic Conference (MEAC) in the 2021 NCAA Division I FCS football season. The Eagles, led by second-year head coach Trei Oliver, played their home games at O'Kelly–Riddick Stadium.

Schedule

References

North Carolina Central
North Carolina Central Eagles football seasons
North Carolina Central Eagles football